The 1991 Albany Firebirds season was the second season for the Firebirds. They finished 6–4.

Regular season

Schedule

Standings

y – clinched regular-season title

x – clinched playoff spot

Playoffs

Roster

Awards

External links
1991 Albany Firebirds on ArenaFan.com

Albany Firebirds Season, 1991
Albany Firebirds
Indiana Firebirds seasons